Vincent Johnson (born September 1, 1956), is an American former professional basketball player and a key player as sixth man for the Detroit Pistons during the team's National Basketball Association (NBA) championships of 1989 and 1990. He was nicknamed "the Microwave" in the NBA for his ability to score quickly off the bench.

College basketball career
Johnson began his collegiate basketball career in 1975 at McLennan Community College in Waco, Texas.  He was a star there for two years, leading the team to the NJCAA national tournament in the 1976-77 season while averaging 29 points per game and being named a junior college All-American.

Johnson transferred across town to attend Baylor University for the 1977–78 and 1978-79 seasons. One of the most prolific scorers in Baylor basketball history, Johnson averaged 24.1 points per game in his two seasons in Waco. A two-time All-American, Johnson is the school record-holder in points-per-game average, ranks 15th in career points, and third in career assists average at Baylor. He was named All-SWC in both 1978 and 1979. Johnson also holds the Baylor record for most points scored in a game with 50 against TCU in 1979.

Professional basketball career
Johnson was chosen as the No. 7 overall pick in the 1979 NBA draft by the Seattle SuperSonics. He was traded to the Detroit Pistons in November 1981. During the 1982-83 NBA season, Johnson scored a career high 15.8 points a game while starting in 51 of the 82 games he played in. For the rest of his career, he would mostly play as an important role player coming off the bench.

At 6 feet 2 inches tall, Johnson's skill set allowed him to come off the bench to replace either point guard Isiah Thomas or shooting guard Joe Dumars. Johnson earned the nickname "the Microwave" from Boston Celtics guard Danny Ainge for his ability heat up an offense by scoring both fast and frequently when inserted into the game.

On June 14, 1990, Johnson made a championship-clinching 14-foot shot with 0.7 seconds left to beat the Portland Trail Blazers 92–90 in Game 5 of the NBA Finals.  The shot, which gave Detroit a repeat championship, briefly earned Johnson a new nickname: 007.

Johnson left the Pistons following the 1990–91 season, playing a final season with the San Antonio Spurs before retiring from the NBA in 1992.

The Pistons honored Johnson's career by retiring his number 15 jersey in a ceremony on February 5, 1994, at The Palace of Auburn Hills. Johnson was influenced by New York City playground legend and basketball Hall of Famer Earl Monroe growing up, and only wore number 15 throughout his playing days. When asked about it by a fan later he said, "It was a huge honor. The fact that they retired my jersey tells me that I did some great things for the organization."

NBA career statistics

Regular season

|-
| style="text-align:left;"|
| style="text-align:left;"|Seattle
| 38 ||  || 8.6 || .391 || .000 || .795 || 1.4 || 1.4 || .5 || .1 || 3.2
|-
| style="text-align:left;"|
| style="text-align:left;"|Seattle
| 81 ||  || 28.5 || .534 || .200 || .793 || 4.5 || 4.2 || 1.0 || .2 || 13.0
|-
| style="text-align:left;"|
| style="text-align:left;"|Seattle
| 7 || 0 || 14.9 || .409 || .000 || .750 || 2.1 || 1.6 || .9 || .3 || 3.9
|-
| style="text-align:left;"|
| style="text-align:left;"|Detroit
| 67 || 15 || 17.8 || .493 || .273 || .754 || 2.1 || 2.4 || .7 || .3 || 7.7
|-
| style="text-align:left;"|
| style="text-align:left;"|Detroit
| 82 || 51 || 30.6 || .513 || .275 || .778 || 4.3 || 3.7 || 1.1 || .6 || 15.8
|-
| style="text-align:left;"|
| style="text-align:left;"|Detroit
| 82 || 0 || 23.3 || .473 || .211 || .753 || 2.9 || 3.3 || .5 || .2 || 13.0
|-
| style="text-align:left;"|
| style="text-align:left;"|Detroit
| 82 || 16 || 25.5 || .454 || .185 || .769 || 3.1 || 4.0 || .9 || .2 || 12.8
|-
| style="text-align:left;"|
| style="text-align:left;"|Detroit
| 79 || 12 || 25.0 || .467 || .154 || .771 || 2.9 || 3.4 || 1.0 || .3 || 13.9
|-
| style="text-align:left;"|
| style="text-align:left;"|Detroit
| 78 || 8 || 27.8 || .462 || .286 || .786 || 3.3 || 3.8 || 1.2 || .2 || 15.7
|-
| style="text-align:left;"|
| style="text-align:left;"|Detroit
| 82 || 1 || 23.6 || .443 || .208 || .677 || 2.8 || 3.3 || .7 || .2 || 12.2
|-
| style="text-align:left; background:#afe6ba;"|
| style="text-align:left;"|Detroit
| 82 || 21 || 25.3 || .464 || .295 || .734 || 3.1 || 3.0 || .9 || .2 || 13.8
|-
| style="text-align:left; background:#afe6ba;"|
| style="text-align:left;"|Detroit
| 82 || 12 || 24.0 || .431 || .147 || .668 || 3.1 || 3.1 || .9 || .2 || 9.8
|-
| style="text-align:left;"|
| style="text-align:left;"|Detroit
| 82 || 28 || 29.1 || .434 || .324 || .646 || 3.4 || 3.3 || .9 || .2 || 11.7
|-
| style="text-align:left;"|
| style="text-align:left;"|San Antonio
| 60 || 23 || 22.5 || .405 || .317 || .647 || 3.0 || 2.4 || .7 || .2 || 8.0
|- class="sortbottom"
| style="text-align:center;" colspan="2"|Career
| 984 || 187 || 24.7 || .464 || .254 || .740 || 3.2 || 3.3 || .9 || .3 || 12.0

Playoffs

|-
| style="text-align:left;"|1980
| style="text-align:left;"|Seattle
| 5 ||  || 2.4 || .333 ||  ||  || .4 || .4 || .2 || .0 || .4
|-
| style="text-align:left;"|1984
| style="text-align:left;"|Seattle
| 5 ||  || 26.4 || .370 || .000 || .895 || 2.8 || 2.4 || .2 || .2 || 10.2
|-
| style="text-align:left;"|1985
| style="text-align:left;"|Seattle
| 9 || 0 || 26.1 || .515 || .000 || .786 || 3.0 || 3.2 || .7 || .1 || 14.2
|-
| style="text-align:left;"|1986
| style="text-align:left;"|Detroit
| 4 || 0 || 21.3 || .449 || .000 || .538 || 4.3 || 2.8 || .8 || .0 || 12.8
|-
| style="text-align:left;"|1987
| style="text-align:left;"|Detroit
| 15 || 0 || 25.9 || .459 || .000 || .861 || 2.9 || 4.1 || .6 || .3 || 14.7
|-
| style="text-align:left;"|1988
| style="text-align:left;"|Detroit
| 23 || 0 || 20.7 || .423 || .143 || .660 || 3.3 || 1.9 || .7 || .2 || 10.3
|-
| style="text-align:left; background:#afe6ba;"|1989
| style="text-align:left;"|Detroit
| 17 || 0 || 21.9 ||.455 || .417 || .758 || 2.6 || 2.5 || .2 || .2 || 14.1
|-
| style="text-align:left; background:#afe6ba;"|1990
| style="text-align:left;"|Detroit
| 20 || 0 || 23.2 || .462 || .286 || .791 || 2.8 || 2.7 || .4 || .2 || 10.3
|-
| style="text-align:left;"|1991
| style="text-align:left;"|Detroit
| 15 || 3 || 29.2 || .464 || .154 || .710 || 5.1 || 2.9 || .7 || .3 || 15.2
|-
| style="text-align:left;"|1992
| style="text-align:left;"|San Antonio
| 3 || 0 || 23.0 || .458 || .500 || .500 || 2.7 || 2.3 || 1.7 || .3 || 8.3
|- class="sortbottom"
| style="text-align:center;" colspan="2"|Career
| 116 || 3 || 23.0 || .453 || .274 || .754 || 3.1 || 2.6 || .6 || .2 || 12.0

Personal life
Johnson grew up in Brooklyn, New York, attending Franklin Delano Roosevelt High School. Johnson has a younger brother, Eric Johnson, who played a season in the NBA with the Utah Jazz.

Following his career with the Detroit Pistons, Johnson established Piston Automotive in 1995. The company found success as a supplier for major international automotive companies, particularly the Ford Motor Company and General Motors. Johnson serves as the Piston Group's chairman and chief executive officer. He has also served as the chairman of the Board of Directors for the joint ventures JL Automotive LLC and PASA Modules, LLC.

In addition to his post-playing career professional work, Johnson is a member of the Michigan Minority Business Development Council, and the Detroit Chamber of Commerce.

See also

 Michigan Sports Hall of Fame

References

External links

 
 Vinnie Johnson Q & A
 Motor City Bad Boys Listing for Vinnie Johnson

1956 births
20th-century African-American sportspeople
21st-century African-American people
African-American basketball players
All-American college men's basketball players
American men's basketball players
Basketball players from New York City
Baylor Bears men's basketball players
Detroit Pistons announcers
Detroit Pistons players
Junior college men's basketball players in the United States
Living people
McLennan Community College alumni
National Basketball Association players with retired numbers
San Antonio Spurs players
Seattle SuperSonics draft picks
Seattle SuperSonics players
Shooting guards
Sportspeople from Brooklyn